TPDF may refer to:

 Tanzania People's Defence Force
 Triangular Probability Density Function, a type of distribution which is used in audio dithering